Surjasta is a 2013 Indian Assamese-language narrative feature film directed by Prodyut Kumar Deka. The story of the film was written by journalist Jitumani Bora and scripted by Chandan Sarma. It is based on child psychology and extra-marital affairs. The film was released on 17 May 2013 in India. It was produced by Rosy Bora and certified U (unrestricted) by the CBFC.

Cast
 Angoorlata
 Mridul Chutia
 Tapan Das
 Queen Hazarika
 Kulada Kumar Bhattacharya
 Himangshu Prasad Das
 Debojit Mazumdar
 Pranjit Das
 Rodali Bora (Child artist)

Awards and nominations
Mridul Chutia and Angoorlata was nominated for Vivel Filmfare Awards 2013 (East) in the Best Actor Male and Female category

References

External links 
 List of Assamese films of the 2010s,

2013 films
Films set in Assam
2010s Assamese-language films